Mathewson Point is a steep, rocky point at the northern tip of Shepard Island, which lies on the seaward edge of the Getz Ice Shelf in Marie Byrd Land, Antarctica.

Important Bird Area
An 80 ha site comprising all the ice-free ground at the point has been designated an Important Bird Area (IBA) by BirdLife International because it supports about 29,000 breeding pairs of Adélie penguins, as estimated by 2010 satellite imagery.

References

 
Important Bird Areas of Antarctica
Penguin colonies
Headlands of Marie Byrd Land